La Salette-Fallavaux is a commune in the Isère department in southeastern France. The sanctuary of Our Lady of La Salette in the mountains above the village is a well-known pilgrimage site devoted to an 1846 Marian apparition.

Population

See also
 Communes of the Isère department

References

Communes of Isère
Isère communes articles needing translation from French Wikipedia